Adriane Allison Rini is an academic and professor of philosophy at Massey University in New Zealand. Her research interests include Aristotelian logic, modal logic, and the history of logic.

Academic career 
Rini earned a bachelor's degree at Smith College. She graduated with a PhD from the University of Massachusetts Amherst in 1997, with the thesis Modal Propositions in Aristotle's Syllogistic supervised by Gareth Matthews.

She moved to New Zealand in 1999 to take up a lecturing position at Massey University. She was promoted to full professor in 2018, with effect from 1 January 2019.

Selected works

Books

Edited volume

Articles

References

External links 

 

Living people
Modal logicians
Women logicians
New Zealand logicians
New Zealand women philosophers
Year of birth missing (living people)
University of Massachusetts Amherst alumni
Academic staff of the Massey University
American emigrants to New Zealand